Mo i Rana is a city, and the administrative centre of the municipality of Rana, in Nordland county, Norway. It is located in the Helgeland region of Nordland, just south of the Arctic Circle. Some of the city's suburbs include Båsmoen and Ytteren in the north, Selfors in the east, and Åga/Hauknes/Dalsgrenda in the south.

The name "Mo i Rana" (English: Mo in Rana) distinguish it from other places named Mo (including the town of Mosjøen, also located in Helgeland). The city's postal address was "Mo 8600" until 1999, when it was changed to "Mo i Rana 8600". Today, the postal address is "8622 Mo i Rana".

This makes it the largest city in Helgeland, and the second largest city (after Bodø) in Nordland county.

Name
Directly translated, the name Mo i Rana means "Mo in Rana". The town (originally the parish) is named after the old Mo farm since the first Mo Church was built there and this is the site of the modern town of Mo. The last element is the name of the large Rana Municipality which means "quick" or "fast", likely referring to the fast water flow in the Ranfjorden which flows past the town. Originally the village (and later the growing town) was generally known simply as Mo, but since many Norwegian settlements bear that name, disambiguating it by specifying it as the one that is located in Rana became commonplace. As the town grew and became more well-known nationwide, the longer form came to dominate. Locals may still refer to it simply as Mo. Also, the short name Mo may also be used as shorthand in contexts in which it is already established that one is referring to Mo i Rana.

Education
In Mo i Rana, Nord University is located at Campus Helgeland just a short distance from shops, cafes and bars, cinema, theater, training facilities, and transport services including an airport. The campus hosts around 470 students from Nord University and 330 students from partner institutions. Campus Helgeland was opened in 2013 and is one of Norway's newest campuses.

Studentorganisasjonen Helgeland (SOH) is the student association at Nord University, Campus Helgeland. The organization was formed on 14 April 2013, and was previously known as Rana Studentforening, but this was changed when the organization became part of the regional mother-organization Studentorganisasjonen Nord in 2020.

History

Mining, building boats (Nordlands boats), and hunting/fishing used to be the main ways of life in Rana. Starting in the summer of 1730, there was a Sámi market in Mo. The market was held on the main church grounds until 1810. In 1860, wholesale merchant L.A. Meyer started a trade center, licensed by royal authority. Meyer traded flour, herring and tobacco, reindeer meat, skins and venison with the Swedes. The trade with Sweden increased especially during Sweden's difficult economic years from 1892 to the start of the First World War. Many paths now used as hiking trails were originally trade paths for mountain dwellers from Sweden to Mo i Rana. One example is a path that starts in the Vindelfjällens Nature Reserve at Ammarnäs and follows the Vindel River valley, then joins Vindelkroken and eventually crosses the Norwegian border to Mo i Rana.

The municipality is rich on iron ores and water to produce power. This was very important for industrial development. The Dunderland Iron Ore Company (1902–1947) established the first mines in Storforshei ( north of Mo i Rana). The mining company Rana Gruber was also established in 1937, and in 1946, the Norwegian Parliament approved plans for the construction of an Iron mill in Norway. A/S Norwegian Iron Work Company was established.

In 1955, the first steel was produced for Norway and other countries. The construction of the iron works took nine years.

During this period the village of Mo i Rana became an industrial city. People from all over Norway moved to Mo i Rana for work. The community needed homes for thousands of new residents and, the construction of houses and residential blocks started immediately. Infrastructure such as electricity and water were established for the city. In 1930, the population was only 1300 people, but had increased to 7,000 by 1955. In 1978 The Iron Mill employed approximately 4,500 of the municipality's 25,000 inhabitants.

The Norwegian Parliament resolved in June 1988 to phase out state ownership of the company. Today there are 119 industrial companies located at the industrial estate (Mo Industrial Park). The companies mainly support the iron and steel industry, the engineering industry, the research and development service industry and the information technology industry. In total, the companies employ approximately 1900 people.

From the end of the Second World War until the early 1990s, Mo i Rana, with the town's steel mill as its cornerstone, was dependent upon heavy industry. Following the decline of heavy industry, new service industries have now grown in the town.

"Graveyard War" in 1951
During the autumn of 1951, around "700 or 800" protesters showed up at the local graveyard as a result of a "nighttime mobilization" to oppose the government's attempt to remove Soviet corpses from graves. Some 93,000 Soviet POWs (Prisoners of War) had been brought to Norway between 1941 and 1945 by the Germans to work on improvements to infrastructure in Norway. A 2013 article in Dagbladet says that "the protests were so powerful that [then minister of defence] Jens Chr. Hauge personally stopped the [government's] action". (Only at this locality, was the government's Operation Asphalt stopped by civilians. More than 8000 Soviet corpses were removed from other graveyards in North Norway, without the government having decided the location of a new graveyard for these corpses. The protests in Mo i Rana were not mentioned in national media during the Cold War.)

Municipal self-governance (1923-1964)
Rana Municipality was established on 1 January 1838, under the old formannskapsdistrikt law. Shortly afterwards, in 1839, the municipality was divided into Nord-Ranen and Sør-Ranen. In 1844, Nord-Ranen was renamed Mo herred.  On 1 January 1923, the village of Mo was designated as a ladested and so it was separated from the rest of the municipality to become a municipality of its own. The new town of Mo (population: 1,305) kept the name Mo and the rest of the old municipality became known as Nord-Rana (bringing back the old name for the area).

During the 1960s, there were many municipal mergers across Norway due to the work of the Schei Committee. On 1 January 1964, the municipality of Nord-Rana (population: 11,636) was merged with the town of Mo i Rana (population: 9,616), the part of the municipality of Sør-Rana located north of the Ranfjorden (population: 697), and the Sjona area of Nesna Municipality (population: 543) to create the large, new Rana Municipality.

Mo was a self-governing municipality from 1923 until 1964. During that time, this municipality was responsible for primary education (through 10th grade), outpatient health services, senior citizen services, unemployment, social services, zoning, economic development, and municipal roads. During its existence, this municipality was governed by a municipal council of elected representatives, which in turn elected a mayor.

Municipal council
The municipal council  of Mo was made up of representatives that were elected to four year terms. The party breakdown of the final municipal council was as follows:

Mayors
The mayors of Mo i Rana municipality:

 1923-1923: Einar Nilsen 
 1924-1924: C. N. Jacobsen
 1925-1925: Einar Nilsen 
 1926-1929: Kristian P. Evjen
 1930-1931: Alf Ljones
 1931-1932: Carsten Venes
 1932-1935: Per Kristian Rygh
 1936-1937: Anton Getz
 1937-1940: Alf Ljones
 1945-1947: Sigurd Marsten
 1947-1948: Alf Ljones
 1948-1955: Erling Lange
 1956-1963: Eilif Granhaug (Ap)

Industry

Norsk Jernverk, established in 1946, produced steel for the country until 1988, when it was divided into several new companies. The iron mill had a significant impact on the town development. In 1978, the city's population had grown from approximately 2000 to 25,000. Mo Industrial Park is one of Norway's largest industrial parks. It is important for the local society, giving work to approximately 1900 people.

The National Library of Norway has a division in Mo i Rana. HelgelandsKraft supplies electric power to the Helgeland region. NRK (Norwegian Broadcasting Corporation) has a division in Mo i Rana. Rana Blad and Rana No Are the towns local newspapers. Radio 3 Rana is the local radio station.

Transport
The airport is a part of the Norwegian STOLport network. Mo i Rana is connected to the Nordland Line railway. This is a railway line between Trondheim and Bodø. The main north–south road in Norway, European route E6, passes through the city. The European route E12 begins in Mo i Rana and connect the city to Sweden and Finland. A bus network runs throughout most of the city and its suburbs.

An international tourist route Blue Highway (in Norwegian: Blå vegen) begins in Mo i Rana. The route goes via Sweden and Finland to Russia.

Culture
Havmann is a sculpture made from Arctic granite located in the Ranfjord. It was made in 1995 by the English sculptor Antony Gormley. It is a part of Artscape Nordland, which can be seen from the city centre. The festival Havmanndagene is held in the town every year in May. Nordland Theater is a regional theater that tours in Nordland. It was established in 1979, and is situated in a new theater building with three stages.

Rana Museum, department of Helgeland Museum, is located in the new museum building "MOment" (2020), situated by the fjord. The museum has a special focus on industrial history, and the main exhibition shows everything from large machines to listening stations with films from old Rana. The industrial adventure and the development that happened also changed the fashion and peoples homes, also showcased through interiors and clothes from the 1960s and 70s.

The county library of Nordland is situated in Mo i Rana.

Churches
Mo Church is the oldest building in Mo i Rana. Built in 1724, it is made of wood and has 400 seats. The church was built on the initiative of Thomas von Westen, a Norwegian priest and missionary who worked among the Sami. Numerous victims of World War II are buried in the graveyard, which receives visitors from the entire world in search of relatives.  Gruben Church is another church in Mo i Rana. It was built in 1965 to serve the growing town. In 1977, Ytteren Church was also built.

Geography 

Mo i Rana is located at the head of Ranfjorden, just on the southern side of the Saltfjellet mountains with the Svartisen glacier, Norway's second largest. The river Ranelva meets the Ranfjorden in Mo i Rana. Rana and Saltfjellet are famous for their numerous caves. Two of the caves are open to the public, Grønligrotta and Setergrotta.

Climate 
Mo i Rana's climate is usually classified as subarctic (Köppen Dfc bordering on Dsc), with long, cold winters, and short, warm summers. There is much precipitation due to the mountains north and east of town, often with much snow in winter. Blizzards in winter can go on for hours, potentially creating traffic difficulties and cancelling flights. Because of Mo i Rana's latitude, summer days are very long and winter days are very short on daylight. In the winter season, the Northern Lights can be seen on the night sky. It varies in intensity, coloured from white green to deep red, and comes in different shapes, such as beams, arches and draperies.

On rare occasions, the overnight low does not go below , known in Norway as tropical night (tropenatt Norwegian).

Autumn begins in September. The trees lose their leaves in October, and the flowers disappear. During November, fresh water and rivers start to freeze, and the landscape is covered with snow. Only the spruce forest stays green throughout the winter. In the winter, the sun is low on the horizon, and is only visible for a few hours. Heating through sunlight is limited because of Mo i Rana's high-latitude location. Mountains block the sunlight when the sun is low on the horizon, which means that the sun is not visible at all during the month of December. There are normally two to three very cold periods in the winter with temperature dipping close to minus 30 °C. The cold periods normally last 3–7 days. The wettest period is autumn and winter, while spring and summer is the driest. The airport is situated in a valley 8 km away from the fjord, so the airport has colder lows than the town itself. The all-time high temperature is  recorded  27 July 2019 (beating 32.6C from July 2018); the all-time low at the airport is  recorded 7 January 2010 (record low for Nov and Dec also from 2010).

International relations

Twin towns – Sister cities
Mo i Rana is twinned with:
 Fairbanks, Alaska, United States
 Petrozavodsk, Karelia, Russia
 Skellefteå, Västerbotten, Sweden
 Aars, North Jutland, Denmark

Notable people

See also
 Arctic Circle Raceway, local race track
 Blue Highway, tourist route

References

External links

Rana municipality web pages
Tourist information about the Arctic Circle area
Image gallery of Mo i Rana
moirana.com – local portal for Mo i Rana

 
Cities and towns in Norway
Populated places in Nordland
Former municipalities of Norway
Rana, Norway
1923 establishments in Norway
1997 establishments in Norway